Michael William D'Arcy (born 26 February 1970) is the current chief executive of the Irish Association of Investment Management. He is a former Irish Fine Gael politician who was elected to the Seanad for the Agricultural Panel in April 2020. He was a Teachta Dála (TD) for the Wexford constituency from 2016 to 2020, and previously between 2007 and 2011. He served as Minister of State at the Department of Finance from 2017 to 2020. He previously served as a Senator for the Administrative Panel from 2011 to 2016.

Early and private life
D'Arcy was born in Gorey, County Wexford, in 1970. He is the son of Michael D'Arcy, a former TD and Minister of State, and the grandson of Timothy D'Arcy, a former county councillor. D'Arcy was educated at Ballythomas National School, Gorey Community School and the University of London, where he studied law. In the past D'Arcy has been an active GAA player, winning an All-Ireland junior football title with Wexford in 1992, and five Wexford senior football titles with Killinierin. He also played youth soccer with Wexford. He is the current chairman of Kilanerin–Ballyfad GAA Club.

Before entering politics, D'Arcy worked as a teacher and a farmer, and continued to run a dairy farm in Annagh near Gorey while serving as a TD. He is married and has two children.

Political career
D'Arcy first held political office in December 2003, when he was co-opted as a Wexford County Councillor for the Gorey area, to replace his father Michael who had been forced to stand down when the Local Government Act 2001 abolished the dual mandate. He was re-elected at the 2004 local elections where he topped the poll.

During his time on Wexford County Council, D'Arcy held the position of the council's vice-chairman. He was also chairman of County Wexford Vocational Education Committee from 2004 to 2007 and a member of the board of management of Gorey Community School and Kilmuckridge Vocational College. He is a former director of Wexford County Enterprise Board and Wexford Organisation for Rural Development.

D'Arcy was first elected to Dáil Éireann at the 2007 general election. His father was previously a TD for the same constituency. He served as the party deputy spokesperson on justice, with special responsibility for Equality from 2007 to 2010, and was the deputy spokesperson on communications, energy and natural resources, with special responsibility for telecommunications from 2010 to 2011. During the 2007 to 2011 term, he served on the Oireachtas Committee on Communications, Energy and Natural Resources.

He lost his seat at the 2011 general election to party colleague Liam Twomey. He was subsequently elected to Seanad Éireann on the Administrative Panel in April 2011, whereupon he became the Fine Gael Seanad Spokesperson on Finance.

He was re-elected to Dáil Éireann for the Wexford constituency at the 2016 general election.

Oireachtas Banking Inquiry Committee
D'Arcy was a member of the Oireachtas Banking Inquiry Committee, which was a joint committee of the Houses of the Oireachtas. It was formally established in November 2014, to inquire into the reasons Ireland experienced a systemic banking crisis. Following completion of its investigation and public hearings, the committee published its final report on 27 January 2016.

Minister of State
D'Arcy was a supporter of Leo Varadkar in his successful leadership campaign. In June 2017, after Varadkar was appointed as Taoiseach, D'Arcy was appointed Minister of State at the Department of Finance and Public Expenditure and Reform, with special responsibility for Financial Services and Insurance. In late 2018, D'Arcy and Minister for Finance Paschal Donohoe welcomed Ireland's issuing of its first green bond, making Ireland one of the first countries in the world to do so. D'Arcy stated that: "Irish Sovereign Green Bonds will help to fund the green projects set out in the National Development Plan which contains €23 billion in direct Exchequer funding for eligible green projects over the next ten years."

On 26 April 2019, D'Arcy and Paschal Donohoe jointly launched Ireland for Finance, a strategy for the further development of the International Financial Services (IFS) sector in Ireland to 2025. The aim is for Ireland to be a top-tier global location of choice for specialist international financial services.

On 11 June 2019, the Government approved the publication of the Investment Limited Partnership (Amendment) Bill 2019. The aim of the bill was to make Ireland a more attractive domicile for private equity fund.

On 20 June 2019, D'Arcy welcomed the completion of Report and Final Stages of the Judicial Council Bill, as part of a series of reforms to reduce increasing insurance premiums in Ireland. The amendments provide for the establishment of a Personal Injuries Guidelines Committee whose sole function will be to develop the relevant personal injury guidelines for appropriate general damages for various types of personal injuries. D'Arcy has stated that bringing the levels of personal injury damages awarded in Ireland more in line with those awarded in other jurisdictions is the single most essential challenge which must be overcome if there is to be a sustainable reduction in insurance costs.

Senator

D'arcy lost his seat at the 2020 general election. He was elected to the Seanad in April 2020. In September 2020, he quit the Seanad to become chief executive of the Irish Association of Investment Management (IAIM).

His appointment was criticised by opposition politicians.  Sinn Féin leader Mary Lou McDonald objected to a recent former minister being employed by an organisation that had lobbied him as a minister.  Labour Party finance spokesperson Ged Nash said it was intolerable for the department of finance to become a “training ground for corporate careers in the financial services industry”. Critics pointed to Standards in Public Office Commission (SIPO) regulations and section 22 of the Lobbying Act, which forbids a person in public office from lobbying for 12 months after leaving that office. IAIM responded that D’Arcy and the association "will not be engaging in any lobbying activities until the 12-month cooling off period has been completed, in adherence with the regulations".

See also
Families in the Oireachtas

References

 

1970 births
Living people
Alumni of University College Cork
Fine Gael TDs
Gaelic games club administrators
Irish farmers
Irish schoolteachers
Local councillors in County Wexford
Members of the 24th Seanad
Members of the 30th Dáil
Members of the 32nd Dáil
Members of the 26th Seanad
People from Gorey
Fine Gael senators
Ministers of State of the 32nd Dáil